The Everglades Stakes was an American Thoroughbred horse race run annually at Hialeah Park in  Hialeah, Florida. For three-year-old horses, the  mile race was run on dirt until 1994 when it was converted to a race on turf. It was elevated to Grade III status in 1999.

Raced for two-year-old fillies in 1939 and 1940, as a result of World War II, there was no race run between 1941 and 1945. On its return in 1946, it was changed to a race for three-year-olds as an important prep race for the Flamingo Stakes that would attract some of the very best horses in the United States.

In 2000, the race was held on the dirt at Gulfstream Park then was run for the last time ever back at Hialeah in 2001 after which the track closed.

The Everglades Stakes was run in two divisions in 1951.

Records
Most wins by a jockey:
 3 – Bill Hartack (1956, 1957, 1958)
 3 – Michael Hole (1972, 1973, 1975)

Most wins by a trainer:
 4 – Horace A. Jones (1948, 1956, 1957, 1958)

Most wins by an owner:
 5 – Calumet Farm (1948, 1956, 1957, 1958, 1968)

Winners

References

Graded stakes races in the United States
Discontinued horse races
Horse races in Florida
Hialeah Park
Widener family
1939 establishments in Florida
Recurring sporting events established in 1939
2001 disestablishments in Florida
Recurring sporting events disestablished in 2001